Florence Cook could mean

Florence Cook (Massachusetts politician), a member of the Great and General Court of Massachusetts
Florence Cook (medium), a medium who claimed to materialise a spirit